The 2018 ECB SuperUtes Series was an Australian motor racing competition for SuperUtes. It was inaugural running of the series. It commenced at the Adelaide Street Circuit on March 1 and concluded at the Newcastle Street Circuit on November 25.

The series was won by Ryal Harris driving a Mazda BT-50.

Teams and drivers 
The following teams and drivers contested the series.

Calendar 
The calendar for the 2018 season was announced at the 2017 Newcastle 500 event. The calendar comprised eight rounds, each supporting a Supercars Championship event, starting at the Adelaide Street Circuit on 1 March and concluding at Newcastle Street Circuit on 25 November.

Series standings
Standings at the completion of Round 6 were Bathurst

References

External links
 

SuperUte Series